Boggs v. Boggs, 520 U.S. 833 (1997), was a United States Supreme Court case in which the Court held that a spouse that is not a participant in an ERISA account cannot will part or all of it before distribution of the pension plan.

Background 
Isaac Boggs worked for South Central Bell for 36 years. He was married to Dorothy Boggs until she died in 1979.  Dorothy and Isaac had three sons together. A year after Dorothy's death, Isaac remarried to Sandra, and they stayed married until Isaac's death in 1989.

When Isaac retired in 1985 from South Central Bell he was given several benefits from his employer.  Among the benefits were a lump-sum distribution from the Bell System Savings Plan for Salaried employees (in the amount of $151,628.94); the amount was rolled over in to an Individual Retirement Account which was untouched during Isaac's lifetime, and at Issac's death was worth $180,778.05.  Isaac also was given at retirement 96 shares of AT&T stock.

In her will Dorothy left her sons an usufruct (which is similar to a common-law life estate; the Boggs lived in Louisiana which recognizes the concept) to 2/3 of Isaac's life-estate.  However Dorothy's will was based on Isaac's will; after Dorothy's death Isaac changed his will, giving everything to Sandra.

Two of his sons filed a complaint in United States District Court to seek a declaratory judgment.

See also
 List of United States Supreme Court cases
 Lists of United States Supreme Court cases by volume
 List of United States Supreme Court cases by the Rehnquist Court

References

External links 
 
 DOJ link

United States Supreme Court cases
United States Supreme Court cases of the Rehnquist Court
1997 in United States case law
Wills and trusts
Employee Retirement Income Security Act of 1974